Miguel Álvarez (born 10 February 1971) is a Spanish rower. He competed in the men's double sculls event at the 1992 Summer Olympics.

References

1971 births
Living people
Spanish male rowers
Olympic rowers of Spain
Rowers at the 1992 Summer Olympics
Sportspeople from Vigo